Wira is a 2019 Malaysian Malay-language action film directed by Adrian Teh. The plot revolves around an ex-military man returning home after a long absence to help his family out of a situation with a local thug named Raja.

Synopsis 
Zain loses a fight against Raja (a crime lord)'s daughter Vee, and Hassan (an ex-military commander) returns to his home. He meets with his childhood friend Inspector Boon Hua, and while they talk a couple of kids fight, but Inspector Boon lets them fight. Hassan meets his sister Zain, and his father where its revealed that his mother died recently. Hassan meets a street thug name Nazmi, where its revealed that Zain is working for Raja.Hassan also meets Ifrit who takes him to an underground MMA fight.

Ifrit leads Hassan to Raja, where its revealed that Hassan used to work for Raja. Hassan asks Raja to leave Zain and his father alone, but Raja declines. Nazmi takes Hassan to a place so he and his thugs can beat him up, but Hassan spares Nazmi after apologizing about his insensitive joke for his sister, and Nazmi lets him go. Hassan goes to Zain to get treated, but get in an argument when Zain learns Hassan talked to Raja. Hassan's dad nearly gets in a fight with social workers and finds Raja's men.

Hassan talks to Inspector Boon, who tries to convince Hassan to take down Raja but Hassan declines. Hassan gets in a fight with his father who doesn't like Raja due to his corruption. Zain and Hassan meet Raja again, and Zain apologizes to Raja over insulting his children and himself. Raja declines, and humiliates Zain by making her eat from a dog bowl. Vee persuades Raja to make them fight in order to clear a hundred percent of their debt.

Hasan and Zain enter the ring to fight against Vee and Rayyan her adopted brother in a mixed martial arts fight. Both of them successfully beat Vee and Rayyan, and enter a bus after noticing Raja's thugs trying to capture them. However, it's a trap as Vee and Rayyan try to attack them for revenge. As the fight goes on, Zain knocks out Vee and indirectly kills Rayyan. Vee drives a bus into a pole, and gets out. Hassan is knocked out, but recovers just in time to escape. Raja doesn't find Hassan and Zain's bodies, and goes to Hassan's place to find him.

Hassan's dad doesn't know where Zain and Hassan is, and stands up to Raja. As a result, he is burned alive. Zain and Hassan arrive too late, and are attacked by Raja's men. Zain wants to find Raja, and runs away. Hassan tries to fight off a crowd of thugs, but is saved by Inspector Boon. Hassan is put in handcuffs, but Inspector Boon frees him after Hassan promises to work with the police to take down Raja. Its revealed that Hassan's dad worked with the police to take down Raja, and Hassan punches Inspector Boon's nose (with his permission) to escape.

Hassan finds Zain, and they are originally surrounded by Raja's henchmens, but after the henchmen receiving calls that Raja killed some of their family members and closed ones, they let Hassan and Zain pass. Hassan and Zain find out Raja helps deal in meth, and are attacked by 3 of Raja's security guards. Hassan and Zain take them down, but during the fight a fire breaks out, and Hassan and Zain barely escape from the explosion. Hassan and Zain fight off Vee and Ifrit, and Zain cuts off Vee's arm but is knocked out by Ifrit. Ifrit seems to have Hassan beaten, but a distraction by Zain gives Hassan the opening to break ifrit's arm before killing him.

Hassan holds Raja at gunpoint, and Raja tries to bargain with him by making Hassan rule Raja's henchmen, but Zain knocks Raja out. Hassan turns himself in, while Zain joins the air force.

Cast 
 Hairul Azreen as Hassan
 Fify Azmi as Zain
 Ismi Melinda as Vee
 Dato' Hilal Azman as Munas
 Dain Said as Raja
 Yayan Ruhian as Ifrit
 Henley Hii as Boon Hua
 Josiah Hogan as Rayyan

Special appearance
 Zizan Razak as Arson Thug 1
 Jack Lim as Arson Thug 2

Cameo appearance
 Nam Ron as Commander Mohd Maznan
 Bront Palarae as Colenal Izzar

Release
Wira was released in Malaysia on 21 November 2019.

References

External links 
 

2019 films
Malaysian action films
2019 action films